The Odisha field hockey team represents Odisha in the national field hockey championships of Hockey India. Hockey Association of Odisha is the state member unit of Hockey India. The Odisha Hockey Team has maintained its dominance in field hockey in India being the most successful team of Hockey India Championships. Hockey Odisha has given India some of its best players including Anupa Barla, Binita Toppo, Birendra Lakra, Dilip Tirkey, Ignace Tirkey, Jyoti Sunita Kullu, Lazarus Barla, Prabodh Tirkey and Subhadra Pradhan. Odisha is now the capital of Indian hockey.

Turfs

Tally

Overall

Performances at National Level

2011

2012

2013

2014

2015

2016

2017

2018

2019

References

Field hockey in Odisha
Field hockey teams in India